XHVE-FM is a Mexican radio station based in Boca del Río, Veracruz. It is owned by MVS Radio and carries its regional Mexican La Mejor format.

The original concession located the station on 102.1 MHz.

References

Radio stations in Veracruz
Radio stations established in 1975
MVS Radio